E. Jane, also known by their performance name MHYSA, is an American interdisciplinary new media artist and musician.

Early life and education 
Jane was born in Bethesda, Maryland in 1990. Jane graduated from Marymount Manhattan College in 2012 with a Bachelor of Arts in art history. In 2016, they graduated with a Master of Fine Arts in interdisciplinary art from the University of Pennsylvania School of Design.

Career 
They have participated in various exhibitions and festivals internationally, including Wandering/WILDING: Blackness on the Internet at IMT Gallery in London in 2016, Post-Cyber Feminist International in 2017, and Glasgow International in 2018. They were based in Philadelphia, Pennsylvania. Jane is currently a 2019–2020 Artist-in-Residence at The Studio Museum in Harlem, and they are based in Brooklyn, New York.

MHYSA 
Jane performs under the musical alter ego name, "MHYSA." MHYSA is also a part of the music duo SCRAAATCH, along with collaborator "lawd knows" (who also goes by "chukwumaa"). In 2017, MHYSA released their debut album, . In February 2020, they released the album NEVAEH for Hyperdub.

The New York Times has said MHYSA's work contains a "wobbly, dreamy club sound." Others have noted the performance as referencing or being connected to 1990s R&B music. MHYSA has described themselves as "an underground pop star for the cyber resistance."

Selected works

Lavendra (2015–) 
Lavendra is a multimedia installation. It was displayed in exhibitions at the PennDesign MFA Program in 2015 and 2016, and as a solo exhibition at the Brooklyn gallery American Medium in 2017 and the Glasgow International in Scotland in 2018. The installation includes references to 1990s R&B (rhythm and blues) divas, such as portrait collages of 1990s black female musicians and songs selected from the time. Digital performances by MHYSA were shown on monitors, and the room was covered in purple light.

Alive #NotYetDead (2015) 
Alive was started in 2015 in response to the death of Sandra Bland. Bland was found hanged in a cell after a traffic arrest in 2015. Jane created a photobooth background with the word "ALIVE" for black women to take pictures with and share on social media using the hashtag #notyetdead. These selfies were uploaded to a website and also displayed in an installation.

Personal life 
Jane uses they and them pronouns.

Awards and honors 
In 2016, they received the Wynn Newhouse Award.

See also 
Womanism 
Afrofuturism

References 

1990 births
Living people
Non-binary artists
Non-binary musicians
New media artists
21st-century American artists
21st-century American musicians
Musicians from Maryland
Artists from Maryland
People from Bethesda, Maryland
African-American musicians
Womanists
Afrofuturists
Marymount Manhattan College alumni
University of Pennsylvania School of Design alumni
African-American contemporary artists
American contemporary artists
African-American women musicians
21st-century African-American artists
21st-century African-American women
21st-century LGBT people